New Zealand National Badminton Championships are officially held since the year 1927.

Past winners

References
1927–1964
2009

External links
Badminton New Zealand

Badminton tournaments in New Zealand
National badminton championships
Recurring sporting events established in 1927
1927 establishments in New Zealand
Badminton